This is a list of people who have served as Custos Rotulorum of Staffordshire.

 William Whorwood bef. 1544–1545
 William Paget, 1st Baron Paget bef. 1547–1563
 Walter Devereux, 1st Earl of Essex 1569–1576
 Thomas Trentham bef. 1577–1587
 Robert Devereux, 2nd Earl of Essex bef. 1594–1601
 Thomas Gerard, 1st Baron Gerard 1601 – aft. 1608
 Robert Devereux, 3rd Earl of Essex 1617–1627
 Sir Edward Littleton 1627–1628
 Robert Devereux, 3rd Earl of Essex 1628 –1642
 Sir Edward Littleton, 1st Baronet 1642–1646
Interregnum
 William Paget, 5th Baron Paget 1660–1678
 James Scott, 1st Duke of Monmouth 1678–1680
 Robert Spencer, 2nd Earl of Sunderland 1680–1681
 Charles Talbot, 12th Earl of Shrewsbury 1681–1688
 Walter Aston, 3rd Lord Aston of Forfar 1688–1689
 William Paget, 6th Baron Paget 1689–1713
 Henry Paget, 1st Earl of Uxbridge 1713–1715
 Henry Newport, 3rd Earl of Bradford 1715–1725
 Washington Shirley, 2nd Earl Ferrers 1725–1729
 vacant?
 John Leveson-Gower, 1st Earl Gower 1742–1754
 Granville Leveson-Gower, 1st Marquess of Stafford 1755–1799
 George Leveson-Gower, 2nd Marquess of Stafford 1799–1828
 Charles Chetwynd-Talbot, 2nd Earl Talbot 1828–1849
For later custodes rotulorum, see Lord Lieutenant of Staffordshire.

References
Institute of Historical Research - Custodes Rotulorum 1544-1646
Institute of Historical Research - Custodes Rotulorum 1660-1828

Staffordshire